Russian orthography is formally considered to encompass spelling and punctuation. Russian spelling, which is mostly phonemic in practice, is a mix of morphological and phonetic principles, with a few etymological or historic forms, and occasional grammatical differentiation. The punctuation, originally based on Byzantine Greek, was in the seventeenth and eighteenth centuries reformulated on the French and German models.

The IPA transcription attempts to reflect vowel reduction when not under stress. The sounds that are presented are those of the standard language; other dialects may have noticeably different pronunciations for the vowels.

Spelling
Russian is written with a modern variant of the Cyrillic script. Russian spelling typically avoids arbitrary digraphs. Except for the use of hard and soft signs, which have no phonetic value in isolation but can follow a consonant letter, no phoneme is ever represented with more than one letter.

Morphological principle
Under the morphological principle, the morphemes (roots, suffixes, infixes, and inflexional endings) are attached without modification; the compounds may be further agglutinated.  For example, the long adjective шарикоподшипниковый, sharikopodshipnikoviy  ('pertaining to ball bearings'), may be decomposed as follows (words having independent existence in boldface):

Note again that each component in the final production retains its basic form, despite the vowel reduction.

The phonetic assimilation of consonant clusters also does not usually violate the morphological principle of the spelling.  For example, the decomposition of счастье  ('happiness, good fortune') is as follows:

Note the assimilation with - so that it represents the same sound (or cluster) as -. The spelling <щастие> was fairly common among the literati in the eighteenth century, but is usually frowned upon today.

Phonetic principle
The phonetic principle implies that:
 all morphemes are written as they are pronounced in isolation, without vowel reduction, Church Slavonic style, or, more strictly, taking inflexion into account (this in combination with the morphological agglutination described above is sometimes called the morphemic principle);
 certain prefixes that end in a voiced consonant (in practice, only those in - ) have that consonant devoiced (become ) to voicing assimilation.  This may be reflected orthographically.  For example, for the prefix/preposition без  'without':

 certain roots and prefixes occasionally have their vowel modified in individual cases to reflect historical changes in pronunciation, usually as a result of being unstressed or, conversely, stressed.

 borrowed words are usually spelled as transliterations, often ignoring actual pronunciation until they become more fully nativized. This is why double consonants are usually retained from original spelling when their pronunciation is not normally geminated.

Pronunciation may also deviate from normal phonological rules.

Etymological principle
The fact that Russian has retained much of its ancient phonology has made the historical or etymological principle (dominant in languages like English, French, and Irish) less relevant.  Because the spelling has been adjusted to reflect the changes in the pronunciation of the yers and to eliminate letters with identical pronunciation,  the only systematic examples occur in some foreign words and in some of the inflectional endings, both nominal and verbal, which are not always written as they are pronounced. For example:

Grammatical principle
The grammatical principle has become stronger in contemporary Russian.  It specifies conventional orthographic forms to mark grammatic distinctions (gender, participle vs. adjective, and so on).  Some of these rules are ancient, and could perhaps be considered etymological; some are based in part on subtle, and not necessarily universal, distinctions in pronunciation; and some are practically arbitrary.  Some characteristic examples follow.

For nouns ending in a sibilant - , - , - , - , a soft sign  is appended in the nominative singular if the gender is feminine, and is not appended if masculine:

 Neither of the aforementioned consonants has phonemically distinct palatalized and unpalatalized variants. A common noun ending in a consonant without - is masculine while a noun ending in - is often feminine (though  there are some masculine nouns ending in a "soft" consonant, with the - marking a different pronunciation).
 Though based on common ancient etymology, by which a hard sign ъ was appended to masculine nouns before 1918, both symbols having once been pronounced as ultra-short or reduced yers,  the modern rule is nevertheless grammatical, because its application has been made more nearly universal.

The past passive participle has a doubled -- , while the same word used as an adjective has a single -- :

This rule is partly guided by pronunciation, but the geminated pronunciation is not universal. The rule is therefore considered one of the difficult points of Russian spelling, since the distinction between adjective (implying state) and participle (implying action) is not always clear. A proposal in the late 1990s to simplify this rule by basing the distinction on whether or not the verb is transitive has not been formally adopted.

Prepositional phrases in which the literal meaning is preserved are written with the words separated; when used adverbially, especially if the meaning has shifted, they are usually written as a single word:

 (This is extracted from a whole set of extremely detailed rules about run-together, hyphenated, or separated components. Such rules are essentially arbitrary.  There are enough sub-cases, exceptions, undecidable points, and inconsistencies that even well-educated native speakers sometimes have to check in a dictionary.  Arguments about this issue have been continuous for 150 years.)

Punctuation

Basic symbols
The full stop (period) (.), colon, semicolon, comma, question mark (?), exclamation mark (!), and ellipsis (…) are equivalent in shape to the basic symbols of punctuation (знаки препинания ) used for the common European languages, and follow the same general principles of usage.
 
The colon is used exclusively as a means of introduction, and never, as in slightly archaic English, to mark a periodic pause intermediate in strength between the semicolon and the full stop (period) (cf. H.W. Fowler, The Kingˈs English, 1908).

Comma usage
The comma is used very liberally to mark the end of introductory phases, on either side of simple appositions, and to introduce all subordinate clauses.  The English distinction between restrictive and non-restrictive clauses does not exist:

Hyphenation
The hyphen (-), and em dash (—) are used to mark increasing levels of separation.  The hyphen is put between components of a word, and the em-dash to separate words in a sentence, in particular to mark longer appositions or qualifications that in English would typically be put in parentheses, and as a replacement for a copula:

In short sentences describing a noun (but generally not a pronoun unless special poetic emphasis is desired) in present tense (as a substitution for a modal verb "быть/есть" (to be)):

Direct speech
Quotes are not used to mark paragraphed direct quotation, which is instead separated out by the em-dash (—):

Quotation
Inlined direct speech and other quotation is marked at the first level by guillemets «», and by lowered and raised reversed double quotes („“) at the second:

Unlike American English, the period or other terminal punctuation is placed outside the quotation.  As the example above demonstrates, the quotes are often used to mark the names of entities introduced with the generic word.

Parenthetical expressions
These are introduced with the international symbol of parentheses (). However, their use is typically restricted to pure asides, rather than, as in English, to mark apposition.

Controversies

Spelling
As in many languages, the spelling was formerly quite more phonemic and less consistent.  However, the influence of the major grammarians, from Meletius Smotrytsky (1620s) to Lomonosov (1750s) to Grot (1880s), ensured a more careful application of morphology and etymology.

Today, the balance between the morphological and phonetic principles is well established.  The etymological inflexions are maintained by tradition and habit, although their non-phonetic spelling has occasionally prompted controversial calls for reform (as in the periods 1900–1910, 1960–1964).  A primary area where the spelling is utterly inconsistent and therefore controversial is:
 the complexity (or even correctness) of some of the grammatical principles, especially with respect to the strung-together, hyphenated, or disjoint writing of the constituent morphemes.

These two points have been the topic of scientific debate since at least the middle of the nineteenth century.

This problem, however, appears to have been resolved by applying the phonetic and grammatical principles (and to a lesser extent, the etymological) to define a complicated though internally consistent set of spelling rules.

In 2000–2001, a minor revision of the 1956 codification was proposed.  It met with public protest and has not been formally adopted.

History

The modern system of spelling was rationalized by Grot in the 1880s.  The spelling reform of 1918 significantly changed the appearance of the language by eliminating two frequently used letters ѣ and і (and two rarely used ones ѳ and ѵ), as well as the use of the word-final ъ (hard sign), although it did not introduce fundamental theoretical changes to the principles he laid down.

Contemporary spelling and punctuation follow the 1956 rules, which were aimed at codifying existing practice rather than establishing new principles.

See also
 Russian language
 Russian alphabet
 Cyrillic script
 Cyrillic alphabets
 Rules of Russian Orthography and Punctuation
 Yoficator

External links

Russian
 GRAMOTA.ru A reference and tutorial site on Russian literacy sponsored by the Russian government
 The full text of the 1956 Russian orthographic codification
 J.K. Grot, Russkoe Pravopisanie (standard guide to the pre-reform rules), 1894 (DJVU file, pre-1918 orthography)
 The Comprehensive Dictionary of the Contemporary Russian Language. The largest Russian dictionary with orthography
 1956 Russian orthographic codification

 
Orthography